Čipnje is a small settlement north of Komen in the Littoral region of Slovenia.

References

External links

Čipnje on Geopedia

Populated places in the Municipality of Komen